The following is a list of episodes for the a British reality television series, Ex on the Beach that first aired on MTV on 22 August 2014.

Series overview

Episodes

Series 1 (2014)

Series 2 (2015)

Series 3 (2015)

Series 4 (2016)

Series 5 (2016)

Series 6 (2017)

Series 7 (2017)

Series 8 (2018)

Series 9 (2018)

Series 10 (2019)
The tenth series of Ex on the Beach was set to air in early 2019, but the broadcast was cancelled after the death of Mike Thalassitis, a cast member featured on the series.

Celebrity Series 1 (2020)

Celebrity Series 2 (2022)

References 

Episodes
Ex on the Beach